Two ships of the United States Navy have been named USS Guadalcanal, after the epic Battle of Guadalcanal in the Solomon Islands during World War II.

 The first  was an escort carrier in service from 1943 to 1946.

United States Navy ship names